A medium Earth orbit (MEO) is an Earth-centered orbit with an altitude above a low Earth orbit (LEO) and below a high Earth orbit (HEO) – between  above sea level.

The boundary between MEO and LEO is an arbitrary altitude chosen by accepted convention, whereas the boundary between MEO and HEO is the particular altitude of a geosynchronous orbit, in which a satellite takes 24 hours to circle the Earth, the same period as the Earth’s own rotation. All satellites in MEO have an orbital period of less than 24 hours, with the minimum period (for a circular orbit at the lowest MEO altitude) about 2 hours.

Satellites in MEO orbits are perturbed by solar radiation pressure, which is the dominating non-gravitational perturbing force. Other perturbing forces include: Earth's albedo, navigation antenna thrust, and thermal effects related to heat re-radiation.

The MEO region includes the two zones of energetic charged particles above the equator known as the Van Allen radiation belts, which can damage satellites’ electronic systems without special shielding.

A medium Earth orbit is sometimes called mid Earth orbit or intermediate circular orbit (ICO).

Use of MEO 
Two medium Earth orbits are particularly significant. A satellite in the semi-synchronous orbit at an altitude of approximately  has an orbital period of 12 hours and passes over the same two spots on the equator every day. This reliably predictable orbit is used by the Global Positioning System (GPS) constellation. Other navigation satellite systems use similar medium Earth orbits including GLONASS (with an altitude of ), Galileo (with an altitude of ) and BeiDou (with an altitude of ).

The Molniya orbit has a high inclination of 63.4° and high eccentricity of 0.722 with a period of 12 hours, so a satellite spends most of its orbit above the chosen area in high latitudes. This orbit was used by the (now defunct) North American Sirius Satellite Radio and XM Satellite Radio satellites and the Russian Molniya military communications satellites, after which it is named.

Communications satellites in MEO include the O3b and forthcoming O3b mPOWER constellations for telecommunications and data backhaul to maritime, aero and remote locations (with an altitude of ).

Communications satellites to cover the North and South Pole are also put in MEO.

Telstar 1, an experimental communications satellite launched in 1962, orbited in MEO.

In May 2022, Kazakhstani mobile network operator, Kcell, and satellite owner and operator, SES used SES's O3b MEO satellite constellation to demonstrate that MEO satellites could be used to provide high-speed mobile internet to remote regions of Kazakhstan for reliable video calling, conferencing and streaming, and web browsing, with a latency (delay) five times lower than on the existing platform based on geostationary orbit satellites.

See also

Notes

References

Earth orbits